The following events occurred in Antarctica in 2020.

Events 

 June 19 – The first fossil egg from Antarctica is discovered. It is the largest soft-shelled egg found to date.
 July 7 – The puzzle of why rising carbon dioxide levels slowed for centuries as Earth warmed from the last ice age is solved by small amounts of marine life found in an ancient Antarctic ice sheet.
 December 21 – Antarctica becomes the last continent to be affected by the COVID-19 pandemic when at least 36 people are confirmed as positive at the Chilean Base General Bernardo O'Higgins Riquelme.

References 

 
2020s in Antarctica
Years of the 21st century in Antarctica